George Renny may refer to:
 George Renny (VC)
 George Renny (surgeon)

See also
 George Rennie (disambiguation)